This is a list of frozen dessert brands. Frozen dessert is the generic name for desserts made by freezing liquids, semi-solids, and sometimes even solids. They may be based on flavored water (shave ice, sorbet, snow cones, etc.), fruit purées (such as sorbet), milk and cream (most ice creams), custard (frozen custard and some ice creams), mousse (semifreddo), and others.

Frozen dessert brands

 Baskin-Robbins
 Ben & Jerry's
 Bon Ice
 Blue Bell Creameries
 Breyers
 Calippo
 Cold Stone Creamery
 Coolhaus
 Dairy Queen
 Del's
 Dole Whip
 Elsie Stix
 Fab
 Fla-Vor-Ice
 Freaky Ice
 Froster
 Golden Spoon
 Golly Bar
 Häagen Dazs
 Haunted House Ice Cream
 The Icee Company
 It's-It Ice Cream
 Keventers Milkshake
 Kwality Wall's
 Little Jimmy's Italian Ices
 Lyons Maid
 Marble Slab Creamery
 Melona
 Menchie's Frozen Yogurt
 Míša
 Otter Pops
 Palapa Azul
 Pinkberry
 Popsicle
 Pudding Pop
 Red Mango, Inc.
 Slurpee
 Slurpee Flavor Tie-Ins
 Snack and a half
 Sour Sally
 Talenti
 Tasti D-Lite
 TCBY
 Thirst Buster
 Tofutti
 Wall's
 Yogen Früz
 Yogurtland
 Yumilicious
 Zooper Dooper

See also

 List of ice cream brands
 List of brand name food products
 List of desserts
 List of food companies
 List of frozen food brands

References

External links 
 

 
Frozen desserts